The HP Pavilion dv1000 series (equivalent to the Compaq Presario ze2000 and V2000 series, and HP Compaq nx4800 series) are "thin and light" 14.1" widescreen laptops manufactured by Quanta and mass-produced under the HP name. There were several different models and revisions of the motherboard which include Intel (single or dual core) or AMD CPUs, and SATA or IDE hard drive models.

Overview
A common issue with some models of this series is the failure of the battery charging/internal power system in which the notebook will not detect DC power when plugged in.

The hp dv1000 was marketed towards home and small business users. A notable feature included was "quickplay", the ability to boot into a dedicated environment for multimedia use.

Three processors were available:
Intel Pentium M and Celeron M Dothan and Banias (855 and 910 chipsets),
Intel Pentium Dual Core, Core Duo (later models with 945 chipset), and
AMD Athlon x2.

Models
The DV 1000 series Contains different models such as the 1000 and 1600 sub-lines with different features.

Pavilion dv1000
Released in 2004 with Intel Celeron M (1.4/1.5 GHz) or Pentium M (1.4-1.8 GHz); up to 1 or 2 GB DDR memory.

Pavilion dv1040 — The 1040 contains a Pentium M CPU with a published speed of approx. 1700 MHz.

Pavilion dv1600
Released in 2006, Intel Core Solo or Duo; Celeron M. Up to 2 GB DDR2. Optional webcam and microphone and speakers by Altec Lansing or Harman Kardon. The recommended operating system for this laptop is Windows XP.

Pavilion dv1658 —  The CPU is an Intel Centrino Pentium M single core processor with virtualization and with a published speed of 1663 MHz.The RAM starting capacity is 512MB with the possibility to upgrade to 2 GB.

References 

Pavilion dv1000 series